John de Bale was the member of Parliament for Gloucester in the Parliament of 1302.

References 

Year of birth missing
Year of death missing
Members of the Parliament of England (pre-1707) for Gloucester